Maximilian Bauer may refer to:

 Maximilian Bauer (footballer, born 1995), German footballer
 Maximilian Bauer (footballer, born 2000), German footballer

See also
 Max Bauer (1869–1929), German World War I officer
 Maximilian Bayer (1872–1917), founder of Scouting in Germany